Bhatiya is a large village in the Devbhumi Dwarka district in the Indian state of Gujarat.

Demographics
 India census, Bhatiya had a population of 17,352: Males constitute 49.31% of the population and females 50.69%. Bhatiya has an average literacy rate of 73.68%: male literacy is 81.55%, and female literacy is 66.16%. In Bhatiya, 12.81% of the population is under 6 years of age.

Transport

Railway
Bhatiya railway station is located on the Western Railway Okha – Ahmedabad Segment. It is 70 km from Okha, 96 km from Jamnagar.

References

Villages in Devbhoomi Dwarka district